The fourth season of the television comedy series Mike & Molly began airing November 4, 2013, on CBS in the United States. The season is produced by Chuck Lorre Productions and Warner Bros. Television, with series new show-runner Al Higgins who replaced Mark Roberts serving as executive producer along with Chuck Lorre. On March 27, 2013, CBS announced that Mike & Molly would return for a fourth season of 22 episodes to air mid-season. On October 9, 2013, it was announced that the fourth season would premiere on November 4, 2013, replacing cancelled comedy We Are Men.

The series focuses on the title characters Mike Biggs (Billy Gardell) and Molly Flynn (Melissa McCarthy), a couple who meet at an Overeaters Anonymous meeting in Chicago, Illinois. After Molly, a primary-school teacher (changing career to author this season), invites police officer Mike to give a talk to her class, they begin dating. As of the end of season 2, the two are married. Mike and Molly live in the home of Molly's mother Joyce (Swoosie Kurtz) and sister Victoria (Katy Mixon). Joyce is in an on-off relationship with widower Vince Moranto (Louis Mustillo), who is often seen at the house. Mike is regularly kept company by his best friend and partner in the police force, Carl McMillan (Reno Wilson). Other prominent characters in the series include Mike's mother Peggy (Rondi Reed), cafe worker Samuel (Nyambi Nyambi), and Mike and Molly's friend and co-Overeaters Anonymous member Harry (David Anthony Higgins).

In promos leading up the fourth-season premiere, CBS billed the series as The New Mike & Molly. Though the cast and setting remains essentially the same, the "new" refers to a reboot of the series from the previous season: Molly has quit her teaching job, and is now pursuing a career as a writer. However, the season did retcon the pregnancy announcement from the third-season finale - though the scene was removed from the US broadcast of the finale - to allow Melissa McCarthy to perform physical comedy throughout the season.

Cast

Main
 Billy Gardell as Mike Biggs (22 episodes)
 Melissa McCarthy as Molly Flynn (22 episodes)
 Reno Wilson as Carl McMillan (22 episodes)
 Katy Mixon as Victoria Flynn (22 episodes)
 Nyambi Nyambi as Samuel (21 episodes)
 Rondi Reed as Peggy Biggs (10 episodes)
 Louis Mustillo as Vince Moranto (19 episodes)
 David Anthony Higgins as Harry (4 episodes)
 Swoosie Kurtz as Joyce Flynn (22 episodes)

Special guest stars
 Susan Sarandon as J.C. Small
 Kathy Bates as Kay McKinnon

Recurring and guest appearances
 Cleo King as Rosetta McMillan 'Nana'
 Brian Baumgartner as James Wisney
 Diane Delano as Isabelle
 Christopher Aguilar as Lousette
 Christian Clemenson as Mr. O'Donnell
 Mo Gaffney as Helen
 Brendan Patrick Connor as George
 John Michael Higgins as Dr. Gayle Rosen
 Gary Anthony Williams as Emcee
 Mather Zickel as James
 Casey Washington as Officer Ramirez
 Steve Bannos as Petros

Episodes

Ratings

Live and DVR ratings

References

External links
Episode recaps at CBS.com
List of Mike & Molly season 3 episodes at Internet Movie Database

2013 American television seasons
2014 American television seasons
Mike & Molly